The Talent is a multiple unit railcar manufactured by Bombardier that was developed by Waggonfabrik Talbot in Aachen shortly before the company was acquired by Bombardier in 1995. The name Talent is an acronym in German for TALbot LEichter Nahverkehrs-Triebwagen (in English, Talbot light suburban railcar).

It comes in a number of variants, including high-floor, low-floor, diesel-mechanical, diesel-hydraulic, diesel-electric, electric, and tilting, and in lengths of two, three, or four carriages. As with most multiple-unit trains, Talent units can run individually, or be coupled together to form longer trains.

Specifications
Classified as heavy rail according to UIC standards, the Talent is a two-, three- or four-part articulated railcar with Jacobs bogies. Partially as a result of this, the interior of an entire unit is essentially a single, long cabin; it is possible to see or walk from end to end without opening doors or passing through narrower gangways. The sharing of bogies also means that a Talent unit cannot be easily disassembled or rearranged without the assistance of a railway yard. In the variants with  floor height, the floor is flat from the first door to the last. The endsections have a raised floor in all variants, because the traction equipment installed underneath requires more space than unpowered bogies. The optional tilting system (called ContRoll) is unique: no swinging bolster is required between the bogie and the car body, but hydraulic cylinders, fitted between the anti roll bar system and the carbody, directly actuate the tilting.

Service
After a prototype was presented in 1994, the first Talents entered service in 1996. They are used by mainline railways in Germany, Austria and Norway. More than 260 are in service worldwide.

In a more unusual use, three diesel Talents identical to Deutsche Bahn's class 643 once formed the fleet for Ottawa's O-Train Trillium Line, a diesel light rail transit line running entirely within the City of Ottawa. The Trillium Line shares a lightly used freight railway line. As the Talent is not certified for concurrent shared-track operation with freight trains in North America, freight traffic is not permitted on the Trillium Line's route while passenger services are running. Although it is still legally classified as a main-line railway, Transport Canada allow the O-Train Trillium Line to use One-Person Train Operation, with fares collected through a proof-of-payment system. In March 2015, all three Talent units were replaced by Alstom Coradia LINT diesel units.

The Talent has now been superseded by the Bombardier Talent 2 and Talent 3.

Operators

 Austria
 Austrian Federal Railways ÖBB Class 4023, 4024, 4124
 Salzburg S-Bahn
 Vienna S-Bahn
 Tyrol S-Bahn
 Styria S-Bahn
 Vorarlberg S-Bahn
 Carinthia S-Bahn
 Germany
 Deutsche Bahn DB Class 643/943, 644/944
 DB Regio Baden-Württemberg
 DB Regio NRW
 DB Regio Mitte
 Transdev Germany
 Nord-Ostsee-Bahn
 NordWestBahn
 Niederbarnimer Eisenbahn
 Ostmecklenburgische Eisenbahn
 Bayerische Oberlandbahn
 eurobahn
 Rhenus Veniro
 Regiobahn
 formerly: Dortmund-Märkische Eisenbahn
 Hungary
Hungarian State Railways MÁV Class 425
 Norway 
 SJ Norge (see NSB Class 93 for details)
 Nordland Line
 Rauma Line
 Røros Line
 Romania
Transferoviar Călători (ex-Regiobahn)
 Slovakia
 RegioJet (leased by Alpha Trains)
 Bratislava–Dunajská Streda–Komarno railway

Former operations 
 Canada
 Ottawa O-Train, Trillium Line

See also
BLS RABe 525

References

External links

page describing the Talent on Bombardier.com

Bombardier Transportation multiple units
Talent
Articulated passenger trains
O-Train
Waggonfabrik Talbot
Multiple units of Canada
15 kV AC multiple units
25 kV AC multiple units